Wringworthy is a hamlet in Cornwall, England, United Kingdom. It is in the parish of Morval on the A387 road.

References

Hamlets in Cornwall